Stories Of Survival is the fourth studio album released by American punk band Authority Zero. It was released on June 22, 2010, through the Suburban Noize Records subsidiary, Viking Funeral Records. Stories Of Survival peaked at number 5 on Billboard's Top Heatseekers chart, and at number 43 on Billboard's Independent Albums chart.

Music Videos were made for the songs, "Get it Right" and "Big Bad World".

Track listing
 "Intro" – 0:18
 "The New Pollution" – 3:03
 "A Day to Remember" – 3:51
 "Brick in the Wave" – 4:01
 "Get It Right" – 3:16
 "Big Bad World" – 4:55
 "Break the Mold" – 2:55
 "Crashland" – 5:25
 "Liberateducation" – 3:48
 "Movement" – 4:10
 "The Remedy" – 3:06
 "No Way Home" – 3:03

Personnel
Authority Zero
 Jason DeVore – vocals
 Zach Vogel – guitar
 Jim Wilcox – drums
 Jeremy Wood – bass

Production and recording
 Jake Dennis – assistant
 Ryan Greene – producer, engineer, mixing
 Stephen Marsh – mastering
 Ken Seaton – management

References

External links
 Authority Zero on Myspace

2010 albums
Authority Zero albums
Suburban Noize Records albums
Albums produced by Ryan Greene